Marc Weller (born 27 October 1951 in Mutzig) is a French former professional football goalkeeper.

He was part of the SC Bastia team that reached the 1978 UEFA Cup Final.

External links
 
 Profile

1951 births
Living people
Sportspeople from Bas-Rhin
French footballers
Association football goalkeepers
Angers SCO players
SC Bastia players
Toulouse FC players
Ligue 1 players
Quimper Kerfeunteun F.C. players
Ligue 2 players
Footballers from Alsace